Michelau is a small town in the commune of Bourscheid, in north-eastern Luxembourg.  , the town had a population of 271, which subsequently increased to 328 by 2019.

It is served by Michelau railway station, which lies on Chemins de Fer Luxembourgeois' Line 10.

References

Bourscheid, Luxembourg
Towns in Luxembourg